The Criminal Law (Defence and the Dwelling) Act 2011 is an act of the Oireachtas which clarifies the law around self-defence in the home after the case around the death of John Ward. The act explicitly enshrines the castle doctrine into Irish law. It was first used as a defence in 2018.

Provisions
The provisions of the act include:
Explicitly laying down that it is not an offence for a person in their dwelling, or who is a legal occupier in a dwelling, to use force in order to protect themselves or their property where they believe that the other person is trespassing and means to commit a crime.
Ensuring that the castle doctrine does not apply to a member of the Garda Síochána acting in their official capacity, any person assisted a member of the Gardaí, or a person lawfully performing a function permitted by law.
Allowing a person to stand their ground and ensuring that nothing within the act should compell them to abandon their dwelling.
Absolving those who use force as outlined in the act to repel a trespasser of liability in tort cases arising from their actions.
Amending Section 18 of the Non-Fatal Offences Against the Person Act 1997 so as to apply the Children Act 2001 to it and to clarify other points of law.

Notes

References

2011 in Irish law
Acts of the Oireachtas of the 2010s
Stand-your-ground law